Khabarovsk Bridge is a road and rail bridge built in 1999. It crosses the Amur River in eastern Russia, and connects the urban-type settlement of Imeni Telmana in the Jewish Autonomous Oblast with the city of Khabarovsk in Khabarovsk Krai. Until that time an older bridge built in 1916 existed nearby.

History

Railway bridge built 1916

Khabarovsk Bridge was originally built in 1916 as a single-track structure that carried the Trans-Siberian Railway line across the Amur River near the city of Khabarovsk, Russia.

The bridge construction was supposed to cost 13,500,000 Russian rubles, and to be done in only 26 months to a design by the eminent bridge builder Lavr Proskuryakov. However, a year after construction began on 30 July 1913, the First World War broke out. Since the bridge was being constructed by Warsaw-based K. Rudzki i S-ka company and the spans were manufactured in its factory in Mińsk Mazowiecki, they had to be brought to Khabarovsk by sea all the way around Eurasia. 

In fall 1914, a merchant ship carrying the last two spans was sunk in the Indian Ocean by the German cruiser Emden, delaying the completion of the bridge by more than a year. The bridge was finally completed for an official opening on October 5, 1916. It was named Alekseyevsky after Alexei Nikolaevich, Tsarevich of Russia.

On April 5, 1920, two of the bridge's eighteen metal spans were detonated by the guerrilla units retreating from Khabarovsk during the provocative speeches of the Japanese military over the course of the Civil War. As a result, the Trans-Siberian railway was torn apart for 5 years.

The reconstruction began shortly after the establishment of Soviet rule in the Far East (since November 1922). The 13th span was assembled in Vladivostok at the plant Dalzavod from the damaged parts of the spans that had fallen into the river by one end. Instead of the 12th span, a reserve one across the Vetluga River (a tributary of the Volga River) was installed, which had a slightly different shape, but was suitable by its dimensions and design. Minor repairs and missing parts were made by the Khabarovsk plant Arsenal (now Daldiesel). The bridge was re-opened to through traffic by March 22, 1925.

In the 1980s, research was undertaken on the bridge with the objective of its renovation. The spans and arches of the bridge were found to be defective, and so speed limits were imposed. At the same time, the bridge's pillars were determined to be in satisfactory condition.

Bridge built 1999

In 1999, a new bridge was built right next to the old one, carrying automobile and rail traffic on two levels. It is 3,890 m long. The original spans of the old bridge were dismantled in the 21st century, though its supports were preserved. One of the spans of the old bridge was saved, restored and set on the banks of the Amur in the Museum of Khabarovsk Bridge, which is located nearby. 
The reconstructed Khabarovsk Bridge is depicted on the 5,000 Russian ruble banknote.

References

Khabarovsk Bridge (Russian language)

See also
The bridge across the Amur River (Komsomolsk-on-Amur)
Trans-Siberian Railway

Railway bridges in Russia
Truss bridges
Road bridges in Russia
Bridges completed in 1916
Bridges completed in 1999
Buildings and structures in Khabarovsk Krai
Transport in the Russian Far East
1999 establishments in Russia
Bridges over the Amur
Transport in Khabarovsk Krai
Rail transport in Khabarovsk Krai